Bulldog may refer to any of the following:

Dogs
The Bulldog is a medium-size breed of dog; the term may refer to any of several Bulldog breeds:
Bulldog, also known as the English Bulldog, or British Bulldog
Old English Bulldog, a now extinct breed
French Bulldog
American Bulldog, is a breed of utility dog descended from the Old English Bulldog.

Places
Bulldog Crossing, Illinois, an unincorporated community, United States
Bulldog Track, also known as the Bulldog-Wau road, a foot track in Papua New Guinea
The Bulldog, an Amsterdam cannabis coffee shop

Military
HMS Bulldog, seven different vessels of the British Royal Navy
Operation Bulldog (disambiguation), four military operations
Bristol Bulldog, a 1920s British fighter aircraft
M41 Walker Bulldog, a US Army light tank
Scottish Aviation Bulldog, a 1970s British training aircraft 
Bulldog, a version of the British Army's FV432 armoured personnel carrier

Vehicles
Lanz Bulldog, a German tractor manufactured from 1921 to 1960
Aston Martin Bulldog, a 1979 Aston Martin concept car
BJJR Bulldog, a British autogyro design

Sports
Bull Dog (horse), a French Thoroughbred racehorse
Bulldog, a popular name and mascot for sports teams and other organizations: see list of bulldog mascots
Bulldog, a professional wrestling throw attacking the opponent's face. The move is also commonly used in steer wrestling.
The British Bulldogs, former English professional wrestling tag-team

Computing
Bulldog (Microsoft), a Master Data Management (MDM) product from Microsoft
Bulldog Communications, a UK Internet service provider
Bulldog, a 1980s computer game label owned by Mastertronic
The Unicode Bulldog Award

Entertainment
music
Bulldog (band), an Argentinian punk rock band
Bulldog, a 1970s American band featuring Gene Cornish and Dino Danelli, formerly of The Rascals
'Bulldog', a song by Tracy Bonham from The Burdens of Being Upright
film and television
'Bulldog' (The Killing), a television episode
'Bulldog', an episode of Thomas & Friends
Bob 'Bulldog' Briscoe, a character in the US sitcom Frasier
Bulldog Drummond, a British fictional detective created by 'Sapper' (H. C. McNeile)
Bulldog Films, a brand name used by film pioneer Will Barker

Nicknames
Bulldog (Oxford University), a common nickname for constables of the former Oxford University Police
GWR 3300 Class, a type of GWR 4-4-0 steam locomotive, used on passenger trains
Bulldog, a synonym for a tractor in Germany (especially in the Munich area), derived from the Lanz Bulldog tractor
Art Donovan (1924-2013), American Hall-of-Fame National Football League player
Ray Drummond (born 1946), American jazz musician and teacher nicknamed 'Bulldog' after the detective
Orel Hershiser (born 1958), American retired Major League Baseball pitcher
Chris "Bulldog" Parker (born 1964), American radio personality from Buffalo, New York
Corey Pavin (born 1959), American professional golfer
Bulldog Turner (1919-1998), American former National Football League player
Bulldog Bob Brown (1938–1997), Canadian former professional wrestler

Other uses
British Bulldog (game), a 'rough and tumble' game informally played in British school yards
Bulldog, former newsletter of the British National Front
Bulldog clip, a piece of office stationery used to temporarily bind together sheets of paper or card
Bulldog edition, a newspaper term for the first edition of the day
Bulldogs, a type of removable cattle nose ring
Bulldogs forceps, a medical clamp
Charter Arms Bulldog, a revolver by American gun manufacturer Charter Arms
Fresno Bulldogs, an American criminal street gang

See also

Lists of people by nickname